The Barbados national under-17 football team, nicknamed Bajan Tridents, is the youth national association football team of Barbados and is controlled by the Barbados Football Association. Its represent the country FIFA U-17 World Cup also  regional competition CONCACAF U-17 Championship. The team hasn't qualified for the FIFA U-17 World Cup

History
Since the formation Barbados national under-17 football team have not performed well in international competitions. They have never qualified for the FIFA U-17 World Cup. The team has qualified thrice for the CONCACAF U-17 Championship and never advanced past the group stage.

Players

Current squad
The following 20 players have been named in the final roster for the 2023 Concacaf Men’s Under-17 Championship that will be held in Guatemala from February 11-26, 2023.

Fixtures and recent results

The following is a list of recent match results, as well as any future matches that have been scheduled.

2019

2023

Competitive records

FIFA U-17 World Cup

CONCACAF U-17 Championship

See also
Barbados men's national football team
Football in Barbados
Sport in Barbados

References

External links

u17
Caribbean national under-17 association football teams
Football in Barbados